Vzdusné torpédo 48 is a 1937 Czechoslovak psychological drama film directed by Miroslav Cikán. It stars Otomar Korbelář, Antonín Novotný, and Raoul Schránil.

Cast
Otomar Korbelář as Colonel Svarc, chief of counterespionage
Antonín Novotný  as Lieutenant Petr Nor, inventor of air torpedo
Raoul Schránil as Flying Officer Jan Domin
Míla Reymonová as Violinist Irena Vengerová
Andrej Bagar as Arnost Gettering, director of the refinery alias chief intelligence service
Karel Hašler as MUDr. Marvan
Zita Kabátová as Helena
Jaroslav Marvan as Generál Herold
Karel Postránecký as Adjutant
Jaroslav Průcha as Commisionar

References

External links
Vzdušné torpédo 48 at the Internet Movie Database

1937 films
Films directed by Miroslav Cikán
Czechoslovak black-and-white films
Czechoslovak drama films
1937 drama films
1930s Czech films